Richard Buckner (born Woolwich, London, 25 October 1812; died 12 August 1883), was an English portrait painter.

Origins

He was the son of Lieutenant-Colonel Richard Buckner (1772-1837), of Whyke House, Rumboldswhyke, Chichester, Royal Regiment of Artillery and a Deputy Lieutenant of Sussex, (a son of Admiral Charles Buckner), by his wife  Mary Marsh Pierce.

Career
Buckner first worked in a studio in Whyke House, his family home.  After serving in the army in 1832 and 1833 as a Second Lieutenant in The King's Royal Rifle Corps he studied painting under Giovanni Battista Cassevari in Rome.  While in Rome Buckner gave advice to Frederick (Lord) Leighton, later PRA, when he was starting his career. Buckner lived in and had his studio in Cleveland Row, opposite St James's Palace, in London.

He first painted miniatures but then changed to painting larger portraits. He painted Italian genre subjects and later elegant and fashionable Victorian ladies.  He first sent work to galleries for sale in 1840.  He exhibited at the Royal Academy of Arts in 1842 and then every year from 1846 to 1877; 77 paintings in all of which only 7 were of Italian subjects  and was nominated as a candidate for the academy.  He also exhibited 22 paintings at The British Institution, 44 at The Royal Society of British Artists, 3 at The Grosvenor Gallery and 3 at The Royal Scottish Gallery.

Buckner's commission book has entries from 1840-1 to 1877.  It lists 989 commissions, a few of which were not executed. It also includes a financial summary from 1842-3 to 1874-5 with fees totalling £67249.  The financial summary indicates that he was in Rome full-time in 1842-3 and 1843-4 and then partly in Rome and partly in London each year from 1844-5 until 1847-8 and again partly in Rome and London 1849-50, 1850-1, 1853-4, 1854-5 and 1856-7 and then partly in Dieppe 1861-2 and Boulogne 1862-3. In 1875, he was commissioned to execute a painting at a price of 500 guineas.

Many engravings based on his works are in the National Portrait Gallery, London. His oil paintings Portrait of a boy and Portrait of a Boy Chorister of the Chapel Royal are in the Victoria and Albert Museum.  Eight National Trust properties have Buckner paintings; images for most of them can be seen on the NT website.  There are also works by Buckner at the British Museum, the National Army Museum, Windsor Castle, Osborne House, Woburn Abbey,  the Birmingham Art Gallery, Harewood House, the Foundling Hospital, County Hall, Maidstone and Castle Leslie in Ireland.  Queen Adelaide, Queen Victoria and Prince Albert commissioned some of his paintings.

Works

References

External links 

1812 births
1883 deaths
19th-century English painters
English portrait painters
English male painters
19th-century English male artists